Anagrams of Desire is an academic textbook about Angela Carter's media writings. Written by Charlotte Crofts and published by Manchester University Press in 2003, the full title is Anagrams of Desire: Angela Carter's Writing for Radio, Film and Television.

The book examines Carter's five radio plays, her two film adaptations, The Company of Wolves (1984) and The Magic Toyshop (1987) and discusses the critically neglected television documentary The Holy Family Album (1991) and the BBC 2 Omnibus documentary about Carter: Angela Carter's Curious Room (1992). The book concludes with a brief discussion of Carter's unrealised dramatic writings, a libretto of Virginia Woolf's Orlando, a stage adaptation of Frank Wedekind's Lulu plays (Erdgeist et al.) and an unproduced screenplay entitled The Christchurch Murders, based on the Parker-Hulme New Zealand murders, the same incident which influenced Peter Jackson's film Heavenly Creatures.

According to Michael Pye of The Scotsman Crofts has "an excellent idea - a strong case for Carter’s less-discussed, less-remembered writing, especially her radio plays - and who writes good, sharp prose when she gets a chance, and who is full of proper doubts about the bigger, more flatulent generalisations that pass nowadays for "theory"."

According to Liz Milner "Croft's book is of limited appeal to a general reader and is best suited to academics interested in Media Studies and Feminism."

The title refers to a line from Carter's short story "The Merchant of Shadows", which concerns film-making and film-makers.

External links 
 MUP
 UBC Press
Review by Michael Pye in The Scotsman
Reference by John Ellis, Royal Holloway University
Review by Liz Milner

2003 non-fiction books
Books of literary criticism